The UK and Ireland SAP Users Group is an independent not-for-profit organisation for users of the SAP ERP software.

History 
The group was formed in 1988 by a small group of enthusiastic SAP users from organisations based in the UK and Ireland who wanted to share and exchange experiences gained while implementing and using software sold by SAP AG. Since it was established it has grown from representing less than 20 organisations to well over 620.

In 2002, under the leadership of its then Chairman, Glynn Lowth, it appointed its first full-time employed member of staff, and began to put in place a new infrastructure to support its membership. In 2004 a new website was launched that for the first time allowed members to collaborate and work together on line. In 2005 the User Group set up a full-time office in Billingham, Teesside where there are now 10 full-time employees.

After a gap of around 10 years, in 2006, it held a new annual conference in Birmingham attended by over 600 users. Further conferences were held in 2007 (Birmingham) and 2008 (London). In 2009 the group took its annual conference to Manchester for the first time, which was the largest independent SAP conference to date. For 2010, Manchester was again the venue and the conference was a three-day event for the first time. In 2012, the Business Objects User Group in the UK merged with it.

In 2013, Alan Bowling, Chairman for 6 years, stood down after leading the organisation through a period of sustained growth and influence, to be succeeded by Philip Adams, the first Chairman from an Irish member organisation. In 2013, the conference returned to Birmingham to celebrate 25 years as a voluntary organisation, with the event attended by over 1,000 people, including the Co-CEO of SAP, Jim Snabe. In 2014, the conference is hosted at the Birmingham ICC. In 2007, the UK & Ireland SAP User Group was one of the founding User Group of SUGEN (SAP User Group Executive Network), and now forms an active part of SUGEN  activities. It is the recognised official group representing all SAP product Users within the United Kingdom and Ireland.

Key Aims of the User Group 
•To facilitate networking and knowledge exchange amongst members,

•To provide an independent voice for SAP users in the UK and Ireland,

•To maintain and develop our close and influential relationship with SAP

•To add value to individuals and organisations, as a member of the user group

Facts and Figures 

Over 620 member organisations based in UK and Ireland.

Over 5500 individuals from member organisations attended meetings in 2013.

Organisations come from private, public and charitable sectors.

17 Special Interest Groups which each meet at least three times a year:

Audit Control & Security (ACS),
Business One,
Business Intelligence/Business Warehouse (BI/BW),
Customer Relationship Management (CRM),
Finance,
Human Resources,
IE (Irish) Payroll,
Implementation & Support,
Ireland,
Maintenance & Service Management (MSM),
Payroll,
Project Systems,
Retail,
Supply Chain Management (SCM),
Scotland,
Testing,
Training.

References

User groups
SAP SE